Samuel Silvera (born 25 October 2000) is an Australian professional footballer who plays as a winger for Central Coast Mariners.

Early life
Born in London, UK, Silvera grew up and started his football career in Australia. He is of Jamaican descent through his father.

Career

Western Sydney Wanderers (NPL)
In 2017 while competing in the U20s NPL NSW 2 for Western Sydney Wanderers, Silvera was honoured as the Wanderers U20 Player of the Year.

Central Coast Mariners
After being released by the Wanderers at the end of the 2018/19 season, Silvera was signed by the Central Coast Mariners on a one-year scholarship on 21 June 2019 after an initial trial period with the club.  On 31 July 2019, Silvera made his professional debut in a Round of 32 FFA Cup clash against Maitland, playing the full 90 minutes and providing an assist for Michael McGlinchey's second goal. He scored his first professional goal in Central Coast's 2–2 draw with Brisbane Roar in the Round of 16 of the FFA Cup on 28 August 2019, scoring their second goal as they went on to win the game 4–2 on penalties. Following an encouraging pre-season, Silvera agreed to a new three-year deal with the Mariners, tying him to the club until 2022. He went on trial with Los Angeles FC of Major League Soccer at the start of the 2020 season.

Paços de Ferreira
On 4 September 2020, Silvera signed for Primeira Liga club Paços de Ferreira for an undisclosed fee. Soon after signing, Silvera was loaned to LigaPro side Casa Pia ahead of the 2020-21 season. Silvera played 4 games at Casa Pia, before then joining Sanjoanense on loan in February 2021 to complete that season.

Ahead of the 2021-22 season, Silvera joined the Newcastle Jets on loan. His decision to sign for Newcastle was a controversial one, given the deep and long-standing rivalry with his former club, Central Coast Mariners. Silvera made 21 appearances for Newcastle during his season-long loan, scoring 1 goal.

Return to Central Coast Mariners (second stint)
After controversially spending the previous season on loan with bitter rivals Newcastle, Silvera returned to the Central Coast Mariners for the 2022-23 season on a 3 year contract. Silvera scored in his first game back for the club against Wellington Phoenix.

Career statistics

Club

References

External links

2000 births
Living people
Soccer players from Sydney
Australian soccer players
Australia youth international soccer players
Australian people of Jamaican descent
Association football midfielders
Primeira Liga players
National Premier Leagues players
Central Coast Mariners FC players
F.C. Paços de Ferreira players
Casa Pia A.C. players
Newcastle Jets FC players
A-League Men players
Liga Portugal 2 players
Australian expatriate soccer players
Expatriate footballers in Portugal
Australian expatriate sportspeople in Portugal